The Angololo Multipurpose Dam is a planned dam across the Malaba River, at the border between Kenya and Uganda. The dam will create a reservoir capable of storing  of water for drinking, irrigation and power generation. The dam is expected to benefit at least 127,300 people in both countries. The dam is also expected to support a mini-hydroelectric power station with capacity of 1.75 megawatts.

Location
Angololo Dam would be located in Kalait Village, in Tororo District, in the Eastern Region of Uganda. The power station would be located accoss the Malaba River, which forms the international border between Kenya and Uganda.

Overview
The dam at this location has been in the plans as far back as 2010. That year, the Nile Equatorial Lakes Subsidiary Action Program (NELSAP) carried out prefeasibility studies with financing in form of grants from the Royal Government of Norway and the Royal Government of Sweden. Following these discoveries, the governments of the two East African countries requested NELSAP to integrate the dam into "its pipeline of projects for further appraisal and development". The project's catchment area measures .

NELSAP undertook a full feasibility study, detailed project designs, conducted environmental and social impact assessment (ESIA), developed a resettlement and compensation action plan (RCAP), and prepared tender documents. This phase of development took 34 months and concluded in July 2022. It cost an estimated US$1.83 million.

Cost and funding
As of July 2022, the cost of construction has not been made public. Funding is expected in form of a loan from New Partnership for Africa's Development (NEPAD). This project received financing support from the African Development Bank during the feasibility study stage.

Other considerations
This water supply project is expected to increase the potable water supply to the towns of Tororo, Manafwa and Namisindwa in Uganda, and to Busia and Bungoma in Kenya.

See also

List of power stations in Uganda

References

External links
  Future Location of Angololo Multipurpose Dam

Hydroelectric power stations in Uganda
Dams in Kenya
Dams in Uganda
Proposed hydroelectric power stations
East African Community
Tororo District
Eastern Region, Uganda
Busia County